Kline is a surname. Notable people with the surname include:

 Adam W. Kline (1818–1898), New York politician
 Boštjan Kline (b. 1991), Slovenian alpine ski racer
 Branden Kline (b. 1991), American baseball player
 Brittani Kline (b. 1991), American fashion model
 Charles H. Kline (1870–1933), American politician, mayor of Pittsburgh, Pennsylvania
 Christopher Paul Kline (b. 1979), American musician known as "Vertexguy" or "the Vertex Guy"
 Franz Kline (1910–1962), American artist
 Jerry Kline (born 1951), American businessman
 John Kline (Harlem Globetrotter) (fl. 1950s), American professional basketball player
 John Kline (politician) (b. 1947), United States Representative from Minnesota
 Kevin Kline (b. 1947), American actor
 Lindsay Kline (1934–2015), Australian cricketer
 Mark Kline, American physician
 Meredith Kline (1922–2007), American theologian
 Morris Kline (1908–1992), American professor of mathematics and writer
 Otis Adelbert Kline (1891–1946), American adventure novelist
 Paul Kline (1937–1999), British academic psychologist
 Phill Kline (born 1959), American lawyer and politician from Kansas
 Richard Kline (b. 1944), American actor who played Larry on the sitcom Three's Company
 Scott Richard Kline (1967-2015), given name of Scott Weiland, American singer and founding member of the alt-rock group Stone Temple Pilots
 Stanley F. Kline (1901–1942), United States Navy sailor and Silver Star recipient
 Virginia Harriett Kline (1910–1959), American geologist, stratigrapher, and librarian

See also 
 Klein (surname)
 Cline (surname)
 Clyne (surname)
Klyne (surname)